The Tropical Turf Stakes is a Grade III American Thoroughbred horse race for horses three years olds and older  at the distance of one mile on the turf held annually in January at Gulfstream Park, Hallandale Beach, Florida.  The event currently carries a purse of $100,000.

History
It was run as the Christmas Day Handicap through 1992.

Open to three-year-old horses and up, it is set at a distance of one and one-eighth miles (9 furlongs) and currently offers a purse of $100,000.

The Tropical Turf is the last of the four $100,000 stakes races on Gulfstream West's "Grand Slam I program."  The My Charmer Handicap is the first, the Three Ring Stakes second, and the Foolish Pleasure Stakes third.

In 2015 this race was run at Gulfstream Park West at one and one-sixteenth mile.

Records
Speed record: 
 1 mile –  1:32.83   –  Tusk  (2020)
  miles – 1:42.47 - Lubash (2017)
  miles – 1:44.95 - Carterista (1993)

Margins: 
 7 lengths –  Sir Cat (1997) 

Most wins by an owner 
 2 - S A Of South Florida   (1992, 1993)
 2 - Joseph J. Sullivan (1994, 1995)
 2 - Moyglare Stud Farm  (1999, 2013)
 2 - Richard C. Thompson  (2006, 2007)
 2 - Aliyu Ben J Stables  (2014, 2016)
 
Most wins by a jockey  
 3 – Rene R. Douglas   (1994, 1999, 2003)
 3 – Javier Castellano   (2008, 2011, 2019)

Most wins by a trainer
 5 – Christophe Clement   (1999, 2012, 2013, 2014, 2016)

Winners

Legend:

 
 

Notes:

† In the 2017 running of the event Rose Briar was first past the post but drifted out in the late stretch and was disqualified and placed second. Lubash was declared the winner of the event.

‡ In the 1983 running of the event World Appeal was first past the post was disqualified and placed second. Eminency was declared the winner of the event.

See also
 List of American and Canadian Graded races

External links
 2020–21 Gulfstream Park Media Guide

References

1972 establishments in Florida
Horse races in Florida
Turf races in the United States
Graded stakes races in the United States
Recurring sporting events established in 1972
Grade 3 stakes races in the United States